In geography, a dry point is an area of firm or flood-free ground in an area of wetland, marsh or flood plains.  The term typically applies to settlements, and dry point settlements were common in history.

In the United Kingdom extreme examples of dry point settlements include Glastonbury, situated on a low hill in the marshy, and once frequently flooded, Somerset Levels, and Wareham in Dorset surrounded by flood plains to the west and Poole Harbour to the east.

A dry point has the advantages of flood protection, fertile soil (due to previous floodings which would have deposited silt on the land) and fairly flat land which is ideal for agriculture and building.

External links

Geography terminology